The Niederhorn (elevation 1963 metres) is a peak of the Emmental Alps in the Bernese Oberland near Beatenberg. It is the peak farthest west in the Güggis ridge. From its summit Lake Thun and the entire Bernese Alps can be seen.

An aerial cable car to the summit was completed in 1946 with a restaurant and children's playground at the top. Today the summit can be reached by the Seilbahnen Beatenberg-Niederhorn, a more modern gondola lift that runs from the village of Beatenberg, where it connects with the Thunersee–Beatenberg Bahn, a funicular with connections to the shipping services on Lake Thun.

It broadcasts FM radio and television.

See also
List of mountains of Switzerland accessible by public transport

References

External links

 Neiderhorn web site (in German)
 Niederhorn on Hikr

Mountains of Switzerland
Mountains of the Alps
Tourist attractions in the Canton of Bern
Cable cars in Switzerland
Bernese Oberland
Mountains of the canton of Bern
Emmental Alps
One-thousanders of Switzerland